Union Sportive Ouvrière Normande de Mondeville is a French association football club founded in 1991. They are based in the town of Mondeville and their home stadium is the Stade Michel Farré, which has a capacity of 2,500 spectators. As of the 2018–19 season, they play in the Regional 1 Normandy due to being administratively relegated from Championnat National 3 after finishing 2nd in their group.

References

External links
USON Mondeville official website 

Mondeville
Mondeville
1991 establishments in France
Sport in Calvados (department)
Football clubs in Normandy